La Yeguada (also known as Chitra-Calobre) is a massive stratovolcano located in Veraguas Province, Panama, north of the Azuero Peninsula.

Description
De Boer et al. were the first to show that La Yeguada volcano is active and part of the extension of the Central American volcanic arc in Panama. Further detailed work on the geochemistry of the lavas from La Yeguada and other volcanoes in Panama was completed by Defant et al. They substantiated, based on geochemistry, that the lavas were derived by subduction (calc-alkaline). Radiometric dates also showed that the volcanism falls into two groups that range from 20 million years to recent. They also showed that the youngest volcanism consists primarily of adakites (partial melts from the subducted slab) whereas the older volcanism is normal calc-alkaline lavas.

The region is also home to several sorts of trees, mainly, guayacanes which are now one of the most abundant trees in the region of Azuero, the valley is also an agricultural grassland since the Laguna La Yeguada works as a natural irrigation system which prevents the region's animals and plants from dehydration.

The woods in the valley is where most of the Panamanian cedro wood is produced.

See also
 List of volcanoes in Panama

References

External links

Mountains of Panama
Stratovolcanoes of Panama
Miocene stratovolcanoes
Pliocene stratovolcanoes
Pleistocene stratovolcanoes